McCracken is a city in Rush County, Kansas, United States.  As of the 2020 census, the population of the city was 152.

History
McCracken was founded in 1886 when the railroad was extended to that point. It was named for J.K. McCracken, a railroad employee.

Geography
McCracken is located at  (38.585088, -99.571981).

Climate
The climate in this area is characterized by hot, humid summers and generally mild to cool winters.  According to the Köppen Climate Classification system, McCracken has a humid subtropical climate, abbreviated "Cfa" on climate maps.

Demographics

2010 census
As of the census of 2010, there were 190 people, 96 households, and 50 families residing in the city. The racial makeup of the city was 93.7% White, 0.5% African American, 2.1% Native American, and 3.7% from two or more races.

There were 96 households, of which 16.7% had children under the age of 18 living with them, 42.7% were married couples living together, 6.3% had a female householder with no husband present, 3.1% had a male householder with no wife present, and 47.9% were non-families. 43.8% of all households were made up of individuals, and 23.9% had someone living alone who was 65 years of age or older. The average household size was 1.98 and the average family size was 2.76.

The median age in the city was 53 years. 19.5% of residents were under the age of 18; 4.7% were between the ages of 18 and 24; 15.4% were from 25 to 44; 31.6% were from 45 to 64; and 28.9% were 65 years of age or older. The gender makeup of the city was 48.9% male and 51.1% female.

2000 census
As of the census of 2000, there were 211 people, 106 households, and 57 families residing in the city. The racial makeup of the city was 98.10% White, 0.47% Native American, and 1.42% from two or more races. Hispanic or Latino of any race were 0.47% of the population.

There were 106 households, out of which 24.5% had children under the age of 18 living with them, 43.4% were married couples living together, 8.5% had a female householder with no husband present, and 45.3% were non-families. 44.3% of all households were made up of individuals, and 28.3% had someone living alone who was 65 years of age or older. The average household size was 1.99 and the average family size was 2.74.

In the city, the population was spread out, with 23.7% under the age of 18, 2.4% from 18 to 24, 19.4% from 25 to 44, 26.1% from 45 to 64, and 28.4% who were 65 years of age or older. The median age was 47 years. For every 100 females, there were 85.1 males. For every 100 females age 18 and over, there were 85.1 males.

The median income for a household in the city was $29,750, and the median income for a family was $34,750. Males had a median income of $31,250 versus $25,250 for females. The per capita income for the city was $13,957. About 12.3% of families and 13.7% of the population were below the poverty line, including 19.5% of those under the age of eighteen and 9.9% of those 65 or over.

Education
The community is served by La Crosse USD 395 public school district.  The LaCrosse High School mascot is LaCrosse Leopards.

McCracken High School was closed through school unification. The McCracken Mustangs won the Kansas State High School boys class 1A basketball championship in 1972.

Media
Part of the 1973 film Paper Moon was shot in the McCracken area. All of the  major building “filming locations”, including the hotel and cafe, are gone, and today are empty lots.

References

Further reading

External links
 McCracken - Directory of Public Officials
 History of Cities in Rush County
 McCracken Info, Legends of Kansas
 Rush County maps: Current, Historic, KDOT

Cities in Kansas
Cities in Rush County, Kansas